White Man Falling is the debut novel by British author Mike Stocks. It won the 2006 Goss First Novel Award.

Footnotes

External links
  Mike Stocks official website
  2006 Goss First Novel Award

2006 British novels
British comedy novels
2006 debut novels